Track Marshall was a brand of earthmoving equipment who were active during WWII building tanks. Later, they produced a range of crawler tractors, based on the wheeled tractor Field Marshall brand. In 1956 the first Track Marshall bulldozer model was introduced and later the Challenger 3 followed by the Challenger 33, the TM55 and also the successful six-cylinder TM70 (probably equivalent to a Caterpillar D5). They also built the TM 955 track loader (a drott) and also a range of rubber tracked bulldozers. The company was in business for some 50 years, eventually closing in 1990 after new machines replaced older technology.

Tractor manufacturers of the United Kingdom